Chi Rongliang (born 9 January 1978) is a former Chinese footballer who played as a midfielder for the Chinese national football team.

Career statistics

Club

Notes

International

References

1978 births
Living people
Chinese footballers
China international footballers
Association football midfielders
Tianjin Jinmen Tiger F.C. players
Chinese Super League players
Asian Games medalists in football
Footballers at the 1998 Asian Games
Asian Games bronze medalists for China
Medalists at the 1998 Asian Games